William E. Eppridge (March 20, 1938 − October 3, 2013) was an American photographer and photojournalist for Life magazine, known for his photography of the dying Robert F. Kennedy, taken in June 1968.

Eppridge was born in Buenos Aires, Argentina on March 20, 1938, and grew up in Richmond, Virginia, Nashville, Tennessee, and Wilmington, Delaware.

Eppridge died of pneumonia caused by a sepsis infection on October 3, 2013, aged 75, at the Danbury Hospital in Danbury, Connecticut.

References

External links

1938 births
2013 deaths
People from New Milford, Connecticut
American photojournalists
Deaths from sepsis
Deaths from pneumonia in Connecticut
Life (magazine) photojournalists